Flodday or Flodaigh (Scottish Gaelic), is a currently uninhabited  island that lies to the north east of Barra and is one of ten islands in the Sound of Barra, a Site of Community Importance for conservation in the Outer Hebrides, Scotland. Its name derives from the Old Norse for "flat island".

Geography and geology
The island is gneiss with fertile soil. A reef to the north ends in a drying islet, Snagaras.

History
Flodaigh supported one family until cleared in 1851.

Notes and references

Islands of the Sound of Barra
Cleared places in the Outer Hebrides